"You Do Something to Me" is a song written by Cole Porter. It is notable in that it was the first number in Porter's first fully integrated-book musical Fifty Million Frenchmen (1929). In the original production, the song was performed by Genevieve Tobin and William Gaxton, performing the roles of Looloo Carroll and Peter Forbes, respectively.

Background
There are two verses and two rounds of the chorus. The song has been described as "a tender prequel" to "Let's Do It, Let's Fall In Love," Porter's first popular song

Recorded versions
The song has been revived and recorded by artists including:
Clicquot Club Eskimos, Harry Reser 1929
Lena Horne on the album It's Love (1955)
 Perry Como on "So Smooth" (RCA Victor album, 1955)
Howard McGillin and Susan Powell in 1991.  
Mario Lanza
Frank Sinatra
João Gilberto
Marlene Dietrich
Doris Day
Sonny Rollins
Susannah McCorkle
Bryan Ferry on As Time Goes By (1999)
Sinéad O'Connor on Red Hot + Blue (1990)
Ella Fitzgerald, the First Lady of Song, recorded this song on both her Cole Porter Songbook albums and on her Pablo classic, Ella à Nice
Bing Crosby recorded the song in 1955 for use on his radio show and it was subsequently included in the box set The Bing Crosby CBS Radio Recordings (1954-56) issued by Mosaic Records (catalog MD7-245) in 2009.  
Bette Midler's version of the song plays over the final credits of the 1991 film Scenes from a Mall, which starred her and Woody Allen.

Popular culture
According to the liner notes for It's De Lovely — The Authentic Cole Porter Collection, the line "the voodoo that you do so well" is quoted in the 1993 Salt-N-Pepa song "Shoop".
The "voodoo" line is also quoted by Hedley Lamarr (Harvey Korman) in the 1974 film Blazing Saddles as he exhorts his gang to attack a frontier town.  The headline "Do Do that Voodoo" was used for a Paul Krugman editorial in The New York Times in 2011.  The column was about Trickle Down economics.

References

External links
 Fifty Million Frenchmen at Internet Broadway Database

1929 songs
Ella Fitzgerald songs
Songs written by Cole Porter
Songs from Can-Can (film)
Songs from Cole Porter musicals